Ian Campbell Hogg (born 15 December 1989) is a New Zealand footballer who is currently playing for Waitakere United in the ASB Premiership. He has represented New Zealand at the Olympic Games on two occasions, Beijing 2008 and London 2012. Hogg was also a member of the senior national side that was involved in qualifying for the World Cup in Brazil 2014.

Club career
Hogg was a member of the Auckland squad that contested the 2009 Club World Cup in United Arab Emirates in 2009. Following the tournament Hogg was named in the National Press's Team of the Tournament alongside Messi. In early August 2012 Hogg was signed by Major League Soccer side Portland Timbers after they traded Mike Chabala to D.C. United Hogg was released by Portland just three months later, failing to make a first-team appearance. In January 2013 Hogg joined A-League side Wellington Phoenix until the end of the 2012–13 season. New Coach of the Wellington Phoenix, Ernie Merrick, did not resign Hogg and he was released from the club. On 24 November 2013, Hogg scored his first goal for Waitakere United against Wanderers SC in the 30th minute in an eventual 4–1 victory.

International career
He represented New Zealand U-20 at the 2007 FIFA U-20 World Cup finals tournament in Canada and was included in the New Zealand squad for the football tournament at the Summer Olympics in Beijing where he played in  all three of New Zealand's group matches against China (1–1), Brazil (0–5) and Belgium (0–1). 
Hogg attended Auckland Grammar School from 2003–2007. Subsequently, Hogg begun studying at the University of Auckland in 2008. In 2012 Hogg was selected for his second Olympic Games in London 2012. Hogg started every game for New Zealand at the tournament who were eliminated after group play after matches against Belarus (0–1), Egypt (1–1) and Brazil (0–3).

In May 2012, he made his debut for the senior team as a left-midfielder in a friendly match against El Salvador and scored in the 27th minute with a left-footed strike. Hogg has been included in the New Zealand Squad for World Cup Qualifiers for Brazil 2014.

However, Hogg is suspended for the first leg of the World Cup intercontinental playoff qualifying match against a qualifier from the CONCACAF Federation (either Mexico or Panama).  As a result, he has also not been considered for the tour of North America playing against Trinidad and Tobago as well club team Chivas.

International goals and caps
New Zealand's goal tally first.

International career statistics

References

External links
 
 
 NZ Football Profile

1989 births
Living people
Association footballers from Auckland
Association football fullbacks
Association football midfielders
New Zealand association footballers
New Zealand international footballers
Olympic association footballers of New Zealand
Auckland City FC players
Hawke's Bay United FC players
Waitakere United players
Portland Timbers players
A-League Men players
Wellington Phoenix FC players
People educated at Auckland Grammar School
University of Auckland alumni
New Zealand Football Championship players
Footballers at the 2008 Summer Olympics
2012 OFC Nations Cup players
Footballers at the 2012 Summer Olympics